Dave Burgering is a US Olympic team diver, Fort Lauderdale Dive Team Diving Director, and Head Coach. Burgering began diving at an early age, and his career included collegiate diving at Michigan State University. He was part of the US team selected for the 1980 Olympic Games. However, he was unable to dive because that year the United States boycotted the Olympics because of the Soviet invasion of Afghanistan. He has been coaching for 32 years, including attending the 2008 Olympic Games as a part of the coaching staff.

Career 

Burgering has a long history with diving; he started diving in 1967 and finished his career in 1984. He first coached for the Missions Viejo Nadadores as a head coach, where his team won two National Team titles in 1987 and 1988. Then, he coached in Boca Raton, Florida for the Mission Bay Makos, where his team beat his former team by one point in the national championship. He is now the head coach of Fort Lauderdale Diving Team and has been coaching there since 2007.

As of 2023, he has coached 1,173 junior national finalists and 51 senior national finalists.

References 

Year of birth missing (living people)
Living people
Michigan State Spartans divers
Michigan State University alumni
American male divers
American diving coaches
Pan American Games medalists in diving
Pan American Games bronze medalists for the United States
Divers at the 1983 Pan American Games
Medalists at the 1983 Pan American Games